Ribal al-Assad (born 4 June 1975) is a Syrian businessman and political activist. He is the Founder and Director of the Organisation for Democracy and Freedom in Syria (ODFS) and the Chairman and Founder of The Iman Foundation.

Early life and family
Ribal al-Assad was born in Damascus, the 13th of 16 siblings. He is the son of Rifaat al-Assad and his third wife Line Al-Khayer, sister in law of the late Saudi king Abdullah bin Abdulaziz, and is thus a member of the al-Assad family. His father, Rifaat al-Assad, a younger brother of the late President Hafez Al-Assad, was a powerful security chief and commander of the Defense Companies, who was responsible for the 1982 Hama uprising. After attempting a coup d'état, he and his family went into exile in France, then the UK. Ribal, at the age of 9, and his family then moved to Paris, where he continued to live until the age of 16. At the age of 16, Ribal al-Assad began High School in New York and Houston, before attending university in Boston.  He holds a Bachelor of Business Administration degree from the InterAmerican University, New York and an MA from the University of Leicester, United Kingdom.

Political activism
In 2006, he became director of the London Bureau of the Arab News Network (ANN), a family owned television channel, which was founded in 1997. After he left ANN he founded the Organisation for Democracy and Freedom in Syria (ODFS) in 2009 and became its director. The organization did not gain prominence until 2010, when Robert Fisk of The Independent interviewed Ribal al-Assad. Of his cousin, Bashar al-Assad: "He is still governing under the ghost of his father. Each person in Syria has an interest in the secret service. Bashar should have declared national unity as soon as he took over. He did things bit by bit, with internet cafes and so on. But it was not enough. There was no real change."

He also appears from time to time on TV and in the print media as a commentator on politics and current events.

Ribal has been critical of the Syrian National Council since its inception. He has pointed-out how it has been overwhelmingly made up of members of the Muslim Brotherhood, who were not elected through a democratic process but hand-picked by Turkey and Qatar. He has also been critical of the Free Syria Army (saying it was made of Islamist extremist groups) and its Supreme Military Council (saying it was exclusively made up of Salafi extremist groups).

The Iman Foundation
Ribal al-Assad’s work as Chairman of the Iman Foundation has focused on promoting interfaith and inter cultural dialogue and challenging extremism across the world. The organisation is not-for-profit and is committed to "promoting inter-religious and inter-cultural dialogue, intra-religious dialogue and challenging extremism and promoting mainstream voices".

References

1975 births
Living people
Assad family
Syrian activists
Syrian democracy activists
Syrian dissidents